Anvar Kamilevich Ibragimov (born 27 November 1965) is a Soviet fencer of Tatar descent. He won a gold medal in the team foil event at the 1988 Summer Olympics.

References

External links
 

1965 births
Living people
Soviet male fencers
Russian male fencers
Olympic fencers of the Soviet Union
Olympic fencers of the Unified Team
Fencers at the 1988 Summer Olympics
Fencers at the 1992 Summer Olympics
Olympic gold medalists for the Soviet Union
Olympic medalists in fencing
Sportspeople from Ufa
Medalists at the 1988 Summer Olympics
Universiade medalists in fencing
Universiade bronze medalists for the Soviet Union
Medalists at the 1985 Summer Universiade
Volga Tatars
Tatar sportspeople
Tatar people of Russia